The Afghan babbler (Argya huttoni) is a species of bird in the family Leiothrichidae.
It is found from southeastern Iraq to south western Pakistan.  It was formerly considered a subspecies of the common babbler.

When compared to the common babbler, the Afghan babbler has a heavier bill and dark streaks on the breast and sides. The vocalizations are also different. The variation is sometimes considered to be clinal but two subspecies have been recognized.
The Afghan babbler group includes salvadorii (De Filippi, 1865) found in Iraq and western Iran and huttoni (Blyth, 1847) from eastern Iran through Afghanistan east to southwestern Pakistan.

The Afghan babbler was formerly placed in the genus Turdoides but following the publication of a comprehensive molecular phylogenetic study in 2018, it was moved to the resurrected genus Argya.

References

Collar, N. J. & Robson, C. 2007. Family Timaliidae (Babblers)  pp. 70 – 291 in; del Hoyo, J., Elliott, A. & Christie, D.A. eds. Handbook of the Birds of the World, Vol. 12. Picathartes to Tits and Chickadees. Lynx Edicions, Barcelona.

Afghan babbler
Birds of the Middle East
Birds of South Asia
Birds of Afghanistan
Birds of Pakistan
Afghan babbler
Afghan babbler